The first elections to Pembrokeshire County Council was held on 4 May 1995.  It was followed by the 1999 election.  On the same day there were elections to  the other 21 local authorities in Wales and community councils in Wales.

Overview
All council seats were up for election. These were the first elections held following local government reorganisation and the abolition of Dyfed County Council. The ward boundaries for the new authority were based on the previous Preseli Pembrokeshire District Council and South Pembrokeshire District Council with the majority of wards continuing to elect one councillor. In some cases where two or three members were previously elected the number of representatives was reduced.

|}

Candidates
Most sitting members of Dyfed County council sought election to the new authority. A number were also members of the previous district councils but others contested a ward against a sitting district councillor.

Results

Amroth
The boundaries were identical to those of the same ward on the previous South Pembrokeshire District Council. The retiring Independent district councillor (and also the county councillor), A.W. Edwards, sought election for the neighbouring Lampeter Velfrey ward and the seat was taken unopposed by the Liberal Democrat candidate.

Begelly
The elected candidate was the retiring district councillor.

Brawdy
The elected candidate was the retiring district councillor.

Burton
The boundaries were identical to those of the same ward on the previous Preseli Pembrokeshire District Council. The elected candidate was the retiring district councillor.

Camrose
The boundaries were identical to those of the same ward on the previous Preseli Pembrokeshire District Council. The elected candidate was the retiring district councillor.

Carew
The boundaries were identical to those of the same ward on the previous South Pembrokeshire District Council. The elected candidate was the retiring district councillor.

Cilgerran 1995
The boundaries were identical to those of the same ward on the previous Preseli Pembrokeshire District Council.

Clydau
The boundaries were identical to those of the same ward on the previous Preseli District Council. The retiring district councillor did not seek re-election.

Crymych
The boundaries were identical to those of the same ward on the previous Preseli District Council. The elected candidate was the retiring district councillor.

Dinas Cross
The boundaries were identical to those of the same ward on the previous Preseli District Council. The elected candidate was the retiring district councillor. The defeated candidate had been Dyfed County Councillor for St Dogmaels since 1993.

East Williamston
The boundaries were identical to those of the same ward on the previous South Pembrokeshire District Council. The elected candidate was the retiring district councillor.

Fishguard (two seats)
The boundaries were identical to those of the same ward on the previous Preseli District Council. The elected candidates were the retiring district councillors.

Goodwick
The boundaries were identical to those of the same ward on the previous Preseli Pembrokeshire District Council. The elected candidate was the Dyfed County Councillor for Fishguard. The retiring district councillor was defeated.

Haverfordwest Castle
The boundaries were identical to those of the same ward on the previous Preseli Pembrokeshire District Council. The sitting Independent member, Beryl Thomas-Cleaver, was heavily defeated.

Haverfordwest Garth (two seats)
The boundaries were identical to those of the same ward on the previous Preseli Pembrokeshire District Council, although the number of seats were reduced from three to two. One of the elected candidates was a retiring district councillor. Another retiring councillor lost his seat to a Labour Party challenger. While the number of seats were reduced, Haverfordwest Garth can also be classified as an Independent hold and a Labour gain from Independent.

Haverfordwest Prendergast
The boundaries were identical to those of the same ward on the previous Preseli Pembrokeshire District Council. The elected councilor was the sitting  county councillor for Haverfordwest Priory, (which included the Castle and Prendergast wards). He defeated the sitting district councillor for Prendergast.

Haverfordwest Priory
The boundaries were identical to those of the same ward on the previous Preseli Pembrokeshire District Council.

Hundleton / Stackpole
The boundaries were identical to those of the combined Hundleton and Stackpole wards on the previous South Pembrokeshire District Council. The elected candidate was the retiring district councillor for Hundleton. The retiring member for Stackpole was defeated. Although a new seat, Hundleton / Stackpole can also be classified as an Independent hold.

Johnston
The boundaries were identical to those of the same ward on the previous Preseli Pembrokeshire District Council. The elected candidate was the retiring district councillor.

Lampeter Velfrey
The boundaries were identical to those of the same ward on the previous South Pembrokeshire District Council. The elected candidate was the retiring district councillor for the Amroth Ward.

Lamphey
The boundaries were identical to those of the same ward on the previous South Pembrokeshire District Council. The elected candidate was the retiring district councillor.

Letterston
The boundaries were identical to those of the same ward on the previous Preseli Pembrokeshire District Council.

Llangwm
The boundaries were identical to those of the same ward on the previous Preseli Pembrokeshire District Council. The elected candidate was the retiring district councillor and also the Dyfed County Councillor for Llangwm since 1985.

Maenclochog
The boundaries were identical to those of the same ward on the previous Preseli Pembrokeshire District Council. The elected candidate was the Dyfed County Councillor for Rudbaxton for many years.

Manorbier
The boundaries were identical to those of the same ward on the previous South Pembrokeshire District Council. The elected candidate was the Dyfed County Councillor for Manorbier.

Martletwy
The boundaries were identical to those of the same ward on the previous South Pembrokeshire District Council. The elected candidate was the retiring district councillor.

Merlin’s Bridge
The boundaries were identical to those of the same ward on the previous Preseli Pembrokeshire District Council. The elected candidate was the retiring district councillor.

Milford Central and East (two seats)
The boundaries were identical to those of the same ward on the previous Preseli Pembrokeshire District Council.

Milford Hakin (two seats)
The boundaries were identical to those of the same ward on the previous Preseli Pembrokeshire District Council.

Milford North and West (two seats) 
The boundaries were identical to those of the same ward on the previous Preseli Pembrokeshire District Council.

Narberth
The boundaries were identical to those of the same ward on the previous South Pembrokeshire District Council. The elected candidate was the retiring district councillor.

-->

Narberth Rural
The boundaries were identical to those of the same ward on the previous South Pembrokeshire District Council. The elected candidate was the retiring district councillor.

Newport
The boundaries were identical to those of the same ward on the previous Preseli Pembrokeshire District Council.

Neyland East
The boundaries were identical to those of the same ward on the previous Preseli Pembrokeshire District Council. The elected candidate was the retiring district councillor.

Neyland West

Pembroke Monkton
The boundaries were identical to those of the same ward on the previous South Pembrokeshire District Council.

Pembroke St Mary (two seats)
The boundaries were identical to those of the same ward on the previous South Pembrokeshire District Council.

Pembroke St Michael
The boundaries were identical to those of the same ward on the previous South Pembrokeshire District Council.

Pembroke Dock Central
The boundaries were identical to those of the same ward on the previous South Pembrokeshire District Council. The elected candidate was the retiring district councillor.

Pembroke Dock Llanion
The boundaries were identical to those of the same ward on the previous South Pembrokeshire District Council.

Pembroke Dock Market
The boundaries were identical to those of the same ward on the previous South Pembrokeshire District Council.

Pembroke Dock Pennar
The boundaries were identical to those of the same ward on the previous South Pembrokeshire District Council.

Penally
The boundaries were identical to those of the same ward on the previous South Pembrokeshire District Council. The elected candidate was the retiring district councillor.

Rudbaxton
The boundaries were identical to those of the same ward on the previous Preseli Pembrokeshire District Council. The elected candidate was the retiring district councillor.

St David's
The boundaries were identical to those of the same ward on the previous Preseli Pembrokeshire District Council. The retiring district councillor was defeated.

St Dogmaels
The boundaries were identical to those of the same ward on the previous Preseli Pembrokeshire District Council.

St Ishmael's
The boundaries were identical to those of the same ward on the previous Preseli Pembrokeshire District Council. The elected candidate was a retiring district councillor for Milford Hakin.

Saundersfoot
The boundaries were identical to those of the same ward on the previous South Pembrokeshire District Council.

Scleddau
The boundaries were identical to those of the same ward on the previous Preseli Pembrokeshire District Council. The elected candidate was the retiring district councillor.

Solva
The boundaries were identical to those of the same ward on the previous PreseliPembrokeshire District Council. The elected candidate was the retiring district councillor.

Tenby (two seats)
The boundaries were identical to those of the same ward on the previous South Pembrokeshire District Council.

The Havens
The boundaries were identical to those of the same ward on the previous Preseli Pembrokeshire District Council.

Wiston
The boundaries were identical to those of the same ward on the previous Preseli Pembrokeshire District Council.

References

1995
1995 Welsh local elections
20th century in Pembrokeshire